Eogena is a monotypic moth genus of the family Noctuidae erected by Achille Guenée in 1852. Its only species, Eogena contaminei, was first described by Eduard Friedrich Eversmann in 1847. It is found in southern Russia, Turkey, Transcaucasia and  Central Asia.

References

Acronictinae
Monotypic moth genera